Alexander Serafimovich (born Alexander Serafimovich Popov; ; O.S. January 7 (N.S. January 19), 1863 – January 19, 1949) was a Russian/Soviet writer and a member of the Moscow literary group Sreda.

Biography
He was born in a Cossack village on the Don River. His father served as a paymaster in a Cossack regiment. He attended a grammar school, then studied in the Physics and Mathematics faculty of St. Petersburg University. During his time at the University he became friends with Aleksandr Ulyanov, Lenin's older brother, who introduced him to Marxism. He was later exiled to Mezen, a town in northern Russia, for spreading revolutionary propaganda. While in exile he wrote his first story, which was published in Russkiye Vedomosti. It was then that he began using the pseudonym "Serafimovich". After his exile ended, he spent many years living under police supervision.

In 1902, he moved to Moscow and became a member of the literary group "Sreda" (Wednesday). During World War I, he was a war correspondent for Russkiye Vedomosti.

At the start of the 1917 Russian Revolution he joined the Bolsheviks, and became a member of the Russian Communist Party (b). In 1918, he became the literary editor of Izvestia. His best known work of this time is the novel The Iron Flood (1924) set during the Russian Civil War and based on a real incident of the Red Taman Army escaping encirclement by the enemy Whites. The Iron Flood was widely translated into a variety of languages, such as Korean and used to advance Soviet and Communist ideology.

After The Iron Flood, he published stories, sketches and plays about the building of the Soviet state and the growth of Soviet culture. In 1934, he was elected to the governing board of the Union of Soviet Writers. He died in Moscow in 1949.

Legacy
Serafimovich's works were praised by many of his fellow writers. Maxim Gorky especially appreciated his talent, introducing him into the Sreda group in Moscow and publishing his works in the Znanie collections. Leo Tolstoy liked his short novel Sand.

The Nobel Laureate Mikhail Sholokov said of him:
"Serafimovich was a great man, a real artist whose stories are near and dear to us; he was one of that generation of writers from whom we learned in our youth."

Vladimir Korolenko said of Serafimovich's first story On the Ice (1889):"Splendid language, full of imagery, terse and powerful, the descriptions bright and lucid."

Awards
Order of Lenin (1933)
Stalin Prize, 1st class (1943) - for long-term excellence in literature
Order of the Badge of Honour
Order of the Red Banner of Labour
Medal "For Valiant Labour in the Great Patriotic War 1941-1945"

English Translations
The Iron Flood, Foreign Languages Publishing House, Moscow, 1956.
Sand and Other Stories, Foreign Languages Publishing House, Moscow, 1956.
Nikita, The Little Miner and Bombs, from In the Depths, Raduga Publishers, Moscow, 1987.

References

External links
 SovLit, encyclopedia of Soviet writers

1863 births
1949 deaths
Soviet novelists
Soviet male writers
Soviet dramatists and playwrights
Stalin Prize winners
Recipients of the Order of Lenin
Soviet short story writers
Saint Petersburg State University alumni
Soviet Marxists
Bolsheviks
Socialist realism writers
Soviet magazine editors